The Colorado Rangers Law Enforcement Shared Reserve (known publicly as the Colorado Rangers) is a governmental police agency in the U.S. state of Colorado. Colorado Rangers are sworn, Colorado P.O.S.T. Certified police officers who serve as force multipliers for law enforcement agencies throughout the state of Colorado. The agency is designed to allow law enforcement agencies to reduce duplicated costs for training, equipment, and deployment of police officers by sharing sworn officers by police agencies throughout the state.

History 
Organized before the Colorado Territory was recognized as a state, the Colorado Rangers continue to serve as the oldest statewide law enforcement agency in Colorado.  

The Colorado Rangers were founded in 1861 as state officers which served to keep the peace and to guard gold and silver shipments from Colorado mines.  Governor William E. Sweet signed an executive order on January 29, 1923, cutting off funding in order to prevent political use of the officers involvement with labor disputes and to weaken prohibition enforcement.  On April 1, 1927 Governor Billy Adams fulfilled a campaign promise to repeal the Department of Safety Act, officially disbanding the Colorado Rangers and with it, all statewide law enforcement in Colorado.  Colorado Rangers were subsequently reorganized as the Colorado Mounted Rangers and remained a statutory auxiliary until reorganization as a statewide shared reserve.  

(For further history of the functional organizations of the Colorado Rangers, see: Colorado Mounted Rangers)

Organization as a statewide shared reserve police force 
Colorado's concept of sharing a statewide police reserve is the first ever implemented in the United States. The agency was created pursuant the recommendations of a Task Force enacted in 2016 by the Colorado Legislature that was delegated to study the Peace Officer Certification and Authority of the Colorado Mounted Rangers.  The task force was mandated by state statute to include the Colorado Attorney General, a county sheriff, the Chief of the Colorado State Patrol, the Director of the Colorado Bureau of Investigation, the Director of the Colorado Division of Homeland Security and Emergency Management, and the Colonel of the Colorado Mounted Rangers.

This Task Force studied the functionality of the Colorado Mounted Rangers while assessing the needs of law enforcement throughout the state.  Members of the task force saw a need for creating a governmental structure that could support a viable law enforcement reserve agency.  The agency needed to be prepared to serve as a supplement to any size police agency,  be widely available throughout the state, and available on a 24/7 basis.  The idea of sharing a reserve police force would create predictability and allow for useful planning and budgeting by partner agencies.  Partner agencies would each pay budgeted amounts annually into the new agency that would fund proper training and management of the Colorado Rangers.  The concept was a winning formula for agencies which allowed them to retire less functional police and sheriff reserve programs and created access to uniformly trained police officers on an as needed basis.  The idea of sharing resources beyond local jurisdiction limits reduced duplicative administrative costs and potential liabilities that exist with locally managed reserve programs.

In 2017, several municipalities worked together to create an intergovernmental agreement that established an independent local government named the Colorado Rangers Law Enforcement Shared Reserve (CLER) that would assume the public title of Colorado Rangers.  The governmental entity was designed specifically to provide Colorado P.O.S.T. certified reserve police officers to agencies throughout the state, which significantly expanded the supportive law enforcement role of the Colorado Mounted Rangers and transformed it back into a fully authorized police agency that is capable of being seamlessly integrated with police agencies that have temporary personnel needs.

As part of the reorganization, the Colorado Mounted Rangers would retire its statutory law enforcement auxiliary and transition their officers into the Colorado Rangers Law Enforcement Shared Reserve.  Rangers who were serving at the time were invited to complete Colorado P.O.S.T. approved police reserve academies tuition-free, funded by an initial $800,000 grant from the state of Colorado.  Those officers that passed the stringent training requirements were allowed to join the new Colorado Rangers entity as certified peace officers.  The Colorado Mounted Rangers officially ceased its operational law enforcement auxiliary function on July 15, 2018, the organization continues to exist as a nonprofit 501(c)(3) that provides foundational fundraising support for the Colorado Rangers.

The statewide shared reserve would be overseen by an appointed Board of Governors whose members are appropriate and qualified for law enforcement oversight and administration guidance.  A police command structure would be established for agency administration, all sworn personnel would be required to obtain P.O.S.T certification, and officers would be granted peace officer status and authority while on duty.

Present day 

The Colorado Rangers provide highly trained, equipped, and experienced personnel to local law enforcement agencies throughout Colorado.  Rangers serve the agency without pay and purchase most of their own uniforms and other equipment designated by the agency.  Officers of the Colorado Rangers are required to attend P.O.S.T. certified police academies and hold a certification at minimum of Reserve Police Officer. Many of the Rangers who serve are former full-time or retired police officers who have maintained their training and certification as peace officers.  The agency has attracted a unique mix of officers not typically found in a local police force who have full-time careers as doctors, lawyers, CEO's, engineers, military, I.T. professionals, politicians, etc. who also serve throughout the state as police officers.

The function of the agency is to provide its services with minimal financial obligation for partner agencies.  Rangers assist with special events, respond to local emergencies, aid in arrests, and provide patrol services when full-time personnel are unavailable.  All officers are fully trained reserve police officers, and many Rangers have advanced and specialty law enforcement training.  The agency also maintains a statistically high number of police instructors per capita within their ranks.

Officers typically sign up for duty shifts and serve on pre-planned "callouts" with partner police agencies.  Rangers are required to maintain certain availability for "on-call" status to respond to emergencies.  The agency has the unique ability to mobilize a large, fully equipped, police presence anywhere in the state with little notice.  Rangers are typically required to serve a minimum of 150 hours of "shift duty" each year in addition to approximately 100 additional hours each year of training.  The agency typically covers the cost of training and provides required insurance.  The sworn staff of the Colorado Rangers collectively serve approximately 30,000 hours each year, saving partner agencies approximately $3 million in overtime and personnel costs annually.  Colorado's shared reserve model has proven to be an excellent fiscal model for reserve or temporary policing.

Impact on the community 

The Colorado Rangers Law Enforcement Shared Reserve functions with other law enforcement and governmental entities through formal mutual aid agreements and have services available directly to agencies throughout the state. This functionality drastically reduces the cost for maintaining separate local reserve programs for each agency.  Sharing this resource affords a higher level of training for each officer, and provides access to more experienced officers and specialties that wouldn't be possible to maintain for each individual agency.

Many smaller communities rely on policing manpower and expertise the Rangers provide for events that would overwhelm the budget and personnel capacity of local police and sheriff departments. The Rangers allow smaller communities to have large events that bring an influx of people into their communities.  Rangers are often seen at fairs, festivals, concerts, parades, and events and the officers have developed a unique expertise in managing large event traffic and crowds. Rangers are considered experts by smaller agencies who don't routinely handle events with large crowds.  The agency also provides police officers for special operations, searches, patrol work, courtroom security, emergency events, and other personnel needs that are requested by partner agencies.  

The impact of the Rangers touches agencies of all sizes: a small town police department may need patrol officers for gaps in coverage, and large agencies such as Denver Police Department who rely upon the Colorado Rangers for a wide variety of policing functions.  

The Colorado Rangers incorporate community policing practices that are friendly and visible, often seen sharing laughs with families and stickers for children.  Rangers utilize a balanced approach with noted emphasis and training designed to protect the rights of the people they serve. They are also equipped, capable, and ready to involve themselves in more serious events such as riots, events of nature, or other emergency police needs.  All officers are required to document each contact with citizens and record their interactions with Body Worn Cameras.

Disasters and emergency management 

Natural disasters rarely impact a single jurisdiction and often overwhelm local authorities. The statewide shared reserve system created in the state of Colorado has been a proven success for large scale emergency events.  

The Colorado Rangers have a unique ability to appropriate a large number of personnel in a way that few agencies can functionally manage.  All Colorado Rangers receive training from FEMA as well as training with other local, state, and federal agencies to remain prepared at all times to support with expanding events. Rapid mobilization allows for local Sheriffs and Chiefs of Police flexibility to manage surprising and unpredictable events.  

The agency has saved agencies in Colorado millions of dollars in personnel costs due to the Rangers ability to integrate into existing operations with ease. The agency becomes invaluable during these times of need and reduces the impact on the full-time police officers and deputies serving in an impacted area.

Colorado Rangers reserve academy 

The Colorado Rangers operate their own grant funded reserve law enforcement academy, approved by the Colorado Peace Officer Standards and Training Board. The Police Academy has graduated nine classes since its inauguration in 2018. The most recent class completed on 31-October-2021 and a future class is being planned to begin in the fall of 2023.  

The academy provides tuition free reserve officer training for those who agree to serve as a Colorado Ranger for a minimum of 3 years and a minimum of 150 duty hours per year.  Cadets that do not serve for 3 years or cadets in training for outside agencies are welcome to attend and required to pay tuition.  Before attending a law enforcement academy, all cadets must first pass a rigorous background check and psychological examination and meet all standards required to be hired as law enforcement officers.  

Colorado Rangers utilize several training facilities throughout Colorado, all Academy courses are typically held at Flatrock Regional Training Center in Commerce City, CO. and lead by instructors from the Colorado Rangers, Adams County, and other agencies.  

The Colorado Rangers maintains a cadre of training personnel which includes an Academy Director and a number of highly qualified instructors in firearms, medical, arrest control, active-shooter, Taser, OC, driving, law, and academics.  Colorado Rangers instructors also support training for outside agencies and lead approximately 1,200 hours of unpaid instructor time in 2021 to support other training programs.   

Sworn Colorado Rangers also routinely participate in advanced level training throughout the state as well as training provided by Federal Agencies such as Department of Homeland Security, FBI, etc.

Rank structure

Commissioned officers

Non-commissioned officers

Fallen rangers 

 Edward P. (Eddie) Bell was killed in the line of duty 16-October-1922 at the age of 33. Ranger Bell and his partner were ambushed while responding to an anonymous tip of a robbery in progress. It is believed that the Rangers were targeted in retaliation for prohibition enforcement.  Ranger Bell is memorialized at the Colorado Law Enforcement Memorial in Golden, CO. as well as the National Law Enforcement Officers Memorial in Washington, D.C.

See also 

 Colorado Mounted Rangers
 Colorado State Patrol
 Texas Rangers
 Arizona Rangers
 California State Rangers
 New Mexico Mounted Patrol

References

External links 

 Colorado Rangers Website

Colorado law
State law enforcement agencies of Colorado
Organizations based in Colorado
Colorado Territory
Colorado
1861 establishments in Colorado Territory